Christianity is the third largest religion in Israel, after Judaism and Islam. At the end of 2022, Christians made up 1.9% of the Israeli population, numbering approximately 185,000 people. 75.8% of the Christians in Israel are Arab Christians. Christians make up 6.9% of the Arab citizens of Israel.

Ten Christian churches are formally recognized under Israel's confessional system, for the self-regulation and state recognition of status issues, such as marriage and divorce: the Armenian Apostolic Church, the Armenian Catholic Church, the Chaldean Catholic Church, the Episcopal Church in Jerusalem and the Middle East, the Greek Orthodox Church, the Latin Catholic Church, the Melkite Greek Catholic Church, the Syriac Catholic Church, the Syriac Maronite Church, and the Syriac Orthodox Church. However, the practice of religion is free, with no restrictions on the practice of other denominations. Approximately 300 Christians have converted from Islam according to one 2014 estimate, and most of them are part of the Roman Catholic Church. A certain number of Israelis also practice Messianic Judaism, usually considered a syncretist form of Christianity. The number of Messianic Jews in Israel is estimated to be around 20,000. They are mostly classified as being "without a religious affiliation" rather than being classified as either Jewish or Christian.

Arab Christians are mostly adherents of the Melkite Greek Catholic Church (60% of Arab Christians in Israel). Some 40% of all Israeli Christians are affiliated with the Melkite Greek Church, and some 30% with the Greek Orthodox Patriarchate of Jerusalem. Smaller numbers are split between the Roman Catholic Latin Patriarchate of Jerusalem, with 13% of Christians, as well as an unknown number of Russian Orthodox  Christians, about 13,000 Maronites and other Syriac Christians, 3,000 to 5,000 adherents of Armenian churches, a community of around 1,000 Coptic Christians, and small branches of Protestants.

Israeli Christians are historically bound with neighbouring Lebanese, Syrian, and Palestinian Christians. The cities and communities where most Christians in Israel reside are Haifa, Nazareth, Shefa-Amr, Jish, Mi'ilya, Fassuta and Kafr Yasif. Arab Christians are one of the most educated groups in Israel. Maariv newspaper has described Arab Christians as "the most successful [group] in the education system", since Arab Christians fared the best in terms of education in comparison to any other group receiving an education in Israel. The Christian communities in Israel run numerous schools, colleges, hospitals, clinics, orphanages, homes for the elderly, dormitories, family and youth centers, hotels, and guesthouses.

History

According to traditional sources, Jesus lived in Roman Judea, and died and was buried on the site of the Church of the Holy Sepulchre in the Old City Jerusalem, making the area a Holy Land for Christianity. However, few Christians now live in the region, compared to Muslims and Jews. This is mainly because Islam displaced Christianity throughout the Middle East, and the rise of modern Zionism and the establishment of the State of Israel has seen millions of Jews emigrate to Israel.

The Christian population in Israel has increased with the immigration of many mixed families from the former Soviet Union (1989-late 1990s), and through the influx of approximately 7,000 Christian Maronites from Lebanon in 2000. Recently, a further increase in Christianity came with arrival of many foreign workers and asylum seekers, some of Christian background (for instance from the Philippines, Eritrea, Ethiopia and South Sudan). As a result, numerous churches have opened in Tel Aviv.

Affiliations

Catholic Church

Six of the particular churches of the Catholic Church have jurisdiction within Israel: the Melkite Greek Catholic Church is by far the largest Catholic church in Israel, the Latin Church (by far the dominant Catholic church worldwide), the Armenian Catholic Church, the Chaldean Catholic Church, the Syriac Catholic Church, and the Syriac Maronite Church.

Eastern Orthodox

Around 30% of Christians in Israel are adherents of the Eastern Orthodox Church, mostly to the Greek Orthodox Patriarchate of Jerusalem, which has jurisdiction over all Israel and Palestine. Eastern Orthodox Christians in Israel and Palestine have many churches, monasteries, seminaries, and other religious institutions all over the land, particularly in Jerusalem. Israel also has many followers of the Russian Orthodox Church, mainly through the immigration of many mixed families from the former Soviet Union (1989-late 1990s).

Oriental Orthodox

Oriental Orthodoxy in Israel is represented mainly by adherents of Armenian Apostolic Church, represented by Armenian Patriarchate of Jerusalem, and adherents of the Syriac Orthodox Church, headed by archbishop Severius Malke Mourad, patriarchal exarch of Jerusalem.

Protestants
There has been a small Protestant community in Israel since the foundation of the state in 1948, who are either Arab Christians who had changed their religious affiliation to Protestant teachings or European and American residents moving to the area.

The Episcopal Church in Jerusalem and the Middle East is a province of the Anglican Communion. The seat of the Anglican Bishop in Jerusalem is St. George's Cathedral, Jerusalem. Other prominent Episcopal churches in the Holy Land include Christ Church, Jerusalem, built in 1849, which is inside the Jaffa Gate of the contested Old City of Jerusalem, and Christ Church, Nazareth, built in 1871, both built during the Ottoman period.

Baptists
The Association of Baptist Churches in Israel was founded in 1965.

Jehovah's Witnesses
Jehovah's Witnesses have been present for decades in Israel. They have faced some religious persecution in the past century. On March 8, 1997, a mob of over 250 people attacked one of their meeting halls. By 1999 it was estimated there were about 850 Jehovah's Witnesses in Israel.
In 2020, the number of Jehovah's Witnesses was 1,957 active publishers, united in 31 congregations; 3,653 people attended the annual celebration of Lord's Evening Meal in 2020.

Jewish Christians

Jewish Christians are not considered bona-fide Jews under Israel's Law of Return (see Oswald Rufeisen).

Hebrew Christian movement

The Hebrew Christian movement of the 19th and early 20th centuries consisted of Jews who converted to Christianity as a result of Protestant missionary activity. It was incorporated into the later parallel Messianic Jewish movement in the late 1960s.

Messianic Jews

The number of Messianic Jews in Israel is estimated at around 20,000.

In Jerusalem, there are twelve Messianic congregations. On 23 February 2007, Israel Channel 2 News released a news documentary about the growing number of Messianic Jews in Israel.

Relations with other religions

Christian–Jewish relations
Hebrew-speakers call Christians Notzri (also romanized Notsri), which means Nazarene (originated from Nazareth). The word is cognate to the Arabic Nasrani.

History
The Israeli Declaration of Independence, issued in 1948, describes the country as a Jewish state but clearly extends religious freedoms to all of its inhabitants by stating that the State of Israel will ensure complete equality of social and political rights to all its inhabitants irrespective of religion, race or sex; it will guarantee freedom of religion, conscience, language, education and culture; it will safeguard the Holy Places of all religions.

During the 1948 Arab–Israeli War, the fate of the Christian Palestinians was similar to that of the Muslims, in term of military administration and land confiscations. However, Christian churches generally avoided destruction or defilement during the 1948/1949 Arab-Israeli War. Aware of the international attention to the conflict, David Ben-Gurion is said to have expressly forbidden to loot or defile holy places. For the same reason, Israeli authorities have a more lenient attitude to the right of return of the Christian refugees.

According to Israeli Ministry of Foreign Affairs, since the reunification of Jerusalem, the Christian as well as Jewish and Islamic holy sites were opened for multinational pilgrims by the Israeli authorities, for the first time since 1948, when the Kingdom of Jordan took over the Eastern half of the city.

As of 2013, the Government - Christians Forum was formed in Jerusalem, under the umbrella of the Ministry of Public Security, to address the concerns of the Christian leaders and representatives in Israel, and in order to empower the relations between the government and Christian leaders and representatives in Israel.

Tensions

Some ultra-Orthodox Jews have been accused of having a decades-old practice of cursing and spitting on Christian clergymen in Jerusalem, and there have been cases where churches and cemeteries were defaced by price taggers. When the doors of the Latrun Trappist monastery were set aflame and the phrase "Jesus was a monkey" was painted on its walls, the Vatican reacted with a rare official complaint against the Israeli government's inaction. In June 2015, an auxiliary building of the Church of the Multiplication was significantly damaged by an arson attack and its walls defaced by Hebrew graffiti, bearing the words "the false gods will be eliminated" (quoted from the Aleinu prayer). This attack was labelled as "terrorism" by Israeli officials.

Prosperity of Christian community
Gabriel Naddaf argues that Israel is the only country in which Christian communities have been able to thrive in the Middle East. However, there has also been criticism by Palestinian Christians of this claim, with such statements being called a "manipulation" of the facts. Members of the Palestinian Christian community claim that such statements attempt to hide the discrimination that Arab Christians face within Israel due to alleged discrimination against Arabs as well as the effect of the occupation of the West Bank and Gaza on the Christian population in these areas.

United Allies

Recently, there has been a steady undercurrent of Arab Christians who seek deeper integration into Israeli society. Under the leadership of Greek Orthodox priest Gabriel Naddaf, United Allies is a political party that advocates Christian enlistment in the Israel Defense Forces and a more distinct societal separation of Christians from Muslims. This separation is partly based on the purported fact that Christians in Israel are not technically Arabs, seeing as they were present in the holy land long before the Arab conquest, hallmarked by the Siege of Jerusalem. This distinction is in the process of being formalized into law, as the Likud government is currently drafting legislation to grant this request.

This new attitude is founded largely by the perception by some that only in Israel the Christian population is growing due to natural increase and no state persecution, seeing the entire Middle East, except Lebanon, as where Christianity is and has been rapidly on the decline. In addition, increasing numbers of Christian leaders and community members are pointing to Muslim violence as a threat to their way of life in Arab majority cities and towns. Sons of the New Testament as a party and a national movement has been met with wide admiration from the Jews of Israel, harshly negative scorn from the Muslim Arabs, and mixed reactions from the Christians themselves. Because of Israel's parliamentary system where each party must attain at least 2% of the popular vote, Sons of the New Testament must be supported by non-Christians to enter the Knesset.

Interfaith institutions 

In 2008, Rabbi Shlomo Riskin, the chief rabbi of Efrat, established the Center for Jewish–Christian Understanding and Cooperation or CJCUC, the first Orthodox Jewish institution to dialogue with the Christian world on a religious and theological basis. The center, currently located in Jerusalem, engages in Hebraic Bible Study for Christians, from both the local community and from abroad, has organized numerous interfaith praise initiatives, such as Day to Praise, and has established many fund-raising initiatives such as Blessing Bethlehem which aim to aid the persecuted Christian community of Bethlehem, in part, and the larger persecuted Christian community of the Middle East region and throughout the world.

Christian–Muslim relations
A recent survey indicated that Christians in Israel are prosperous and well-educated – but some fear that Muslim intimidation will cause a mass escape to the West. The Christian communities in Nazareth tend to be wealthier and better educated compare to other Arabs elsewhere in Israel, and Christians of Nazareth occupy the majority of the top positions in the town: three hospitals and bank managers, judges and school principals and faculties. The socio-economic gap between the Christians wealth and Muslim poverty led sometimes to sectarian crises.

Recently there has been an increase of anti-Christian incidents in the Nazareth area, inspired by the rise of Jihadist forces in the Middle East. Many Christians have complained of being targeted by Muslims, whom they believe are trying to either drive them out of cities that have traditionally had large Christian populations, or to "persuade" them to convert. In 1999, for example, radical Muslims in Nazareth rioted as they attempted to wrest land from a major Christian shrine to build a mosque. In one incident during 2014, a flag of the Islamic State of Iraq and the Levant was installed in front of a church in Nazareth.

There has also been increasing incitement and violence by the Muslims against Christians who voice their support for the Israel Defense Forces. In a recent case, the son of Gabriel Naddaf, a prominent Eastern Orthodox priest who is regarded as being pro-Israel, was severely beaten. Nadaf himself has been suffering from vasts amount of Muslim incitement in recent years.

A 2015 study estimates some 300 Christians from a Muslim background in Israel.

A 2016 study by Pew research points to the convergence of political views of both Muslims and Christians over issues like – Israel cannot be a Jewish state and a democracy at the same time (Christians: 72%; Muslims: 63%), US being too supportive of Israel (Christians: 86%; Muslims: 75%), Israeli government not making enough efforts to make peace with Palestine (Christians: 80%; Muslims: 72%).

Demographics

Education 

According to the study "Are Christian Arabs the New Israeli Jews? Reflections on the Educational Level of Arab Christians in Israel" by Hanna David from the University of Tel Aviv, one of the factors why Arab Christians are the most educated segment of Israel's population is the high level of the Christian educational institutions. Christian schools in Israel are among the best schools in the country, and while those schools represent only 4% of the Arab schooling sector, about 34% of Arab university students come from Christian schools, and about 87% of the Israeli Arabs in the high tech sector have been educated in Christian schools. A 2011 Maariv article described the Christian Arab sector as "the most successful in the education system", an opinion supported by others who point out that Christian Arabs fared best in terms of education in comparison to any other group receiving an education in Israel.

High school and matriculation exams
The Israel Central Bureau of Statistics noted that when taking into account the data recorded over the years, Arab Christians fared the best in terms of education in comparison to any other group receiving an education in Israel. In 2016 Arab Christians had the highest rates of success at matriculation examinations, namely 73.9%, both in comparison to Muslim and Druze Israelis (41% and 51.9% respectively), and to the students from the different branches of the Hebrew (majority Jewish) education system considered as one group (55.1%).

Higher education
Arab Christians are one of the most educated groups in Israel. Statistically, Arab Christians in Israel have the highest rates of educational attainment among all religious communities, according to a data by Israel Central Bureau of Statistics in 2010, 63% of Arab Christians have had college or postgraduate education, the highest of any religious group. Despite the fact that Arab Christians only represent 2.1% of the total Israeli population, in 2014 they accounted for 17.0% of the country's university students, and for 14.4% of its college students. The percentage of Arab Christian women who are receiving higher education is also higher than that of other groups. There are more Christians who have attained a bachelor's degree or higher academic degrees than the median Israeli population.

The rate of students studying in the field of medicine was higher among Christian Arab students than that of all other sectors.

In 2013, Arab Christian students were also the vanguard in terms of eligibility for higher education, as the Christian Arab students had the highest rates of receiving Psychometric Entrance Test scores which make them eligible for acceptance into universities, data from the Israel Central Bureau of Statistics show that 61% of Arab Christians were eligible for university studies, compared to 50% of Jewish, 45% of Druze, and 35% of Muslim students.

Socio-economic 
In terms of their socio-economic situation, Arab Christians are more similar to the Jewish population than to the Muslim Arab population. They have the lowest incidence of poverty and the lowest percentage of unemployment which is 4.9% compared to 6.5% among Jewish men and women. They have also the highest median household income among Arab citizens of Israel and second highest median household income among the Israeli ethno-religious groups. Arab Christians also have a high presentation in science and in the white collar professions. In Israel, Arab Christians are portrayed as a hard-working and upper-middle-class educated ethno-religious minority. According to study the majority of Christians in Israel (68.2 per cent) are employed in the service sector, i.e. banks, insurance companies, schools, tourism, hospitals etc.

Largest communities
In 2019, approximately 70.2% of Arab Christians resided in the Northern District, 13.3% in the Haifa District, 9.5% in the Jerusalem District, 3.4% in the Central District, 2.7% in the Tel Aviv District and 0.5% in the Southern District. Approximately 23.5% of Non-Arab Christians resided in the Tel Aviv District, 19.4% in the Haifa District, 17.5% in the Central District, 14.4% in the Northern District, 14.3% in the Southern District and 9.8% in the Jerusalem District.

Nazareth has the largest Christian Arab population, followed by Haifa. The majority of Haifa's Arab minority is Christian. The Christian Arab communities in Nazareth and Haifa tend to be wealthier and better educated compared to other Arabs elsewhere in Israel. Arab Christians also live in a number of other localities in the Galilee; such as Abu Snan, Arraba, Bi'ina, Deir Hanna, I'billin, Jadeidi-Makr, Kafr Kanna, Muqeible, Ras al-Ein, Reineh, Sakhnin, Shefa-Amr, Tur'an and Yafa an-Naseriyye.

Localities such as Eilabun, Jish, Kafr Yasif and Rameh are predominantly Christians, and nearly all the population of Fassuta and Mi'ilya are Melkite Christians. Some Druze villages, such as Daliyat al-Karmel, Ein Qiniyye, Hurfeish, Isfiya, Kisra-Sumei, Maghar, Majdal Shams and Peki'in, have small Christian Arab populations. Mixed cities such as Acre, Jerusalem, Lod, Ma'alot-Tarshiha, Nof HaGalil, Ramla and Tel Aviv-Jaffa have significant Christian Arab populations.

 Note: The overwhelming majority of the Christians in the Northern District are Arab Christians.

Religiosity 

Christians in Israel are generally more religious than Israeli Jews and Druzes. Over half (57%) say religion is very important in their lives. About one third (34%) pray daily and 38% report that they attend church at least once a week. Israeli Christians also are more likely than Jews and Druze to participate in weekly worship services. Nearly all (94%) Israeli Christians believe in God, of whom 79% say they are absolutely certain.

Beliefs and practices 
According to a Pew Research Center survey conducted in 2015, 60% of Christians in Israel fast during Lent, Most (81%) also said that they have icons of saints or other holy figures in their home. Of them, 83% claimed that their icons were anointed with holy oil. The survey also found that the majority of Israeli Christians (89%) say the Bible is the word of God, of whom 65% believe that the Bible should be taken literally. 33% of Christians believe that Jesus will return during their lifetime, which was similar to the number of Muslims who held that belief (33%).

The majority of Christians are not comfortable with their child marrying outside of the faith.

Identity 
Christians in Israel are more likely than Jews, Muslims, and Druze to say they are proud of their identity. About 89% say they have a strong sense of belonging to the Christian community. Two thirds believe that they have a special responsibility to help fellow members of their religious group who are in need around the world.

The nature of Christian identity varies among Christians as well. Christians in Israel are about evenly divided among those who say their identity is mainly a matter of religion (31%), those who say being Christian is mainly about ancestry and/or culture (34%) and those who say their identity is characterized by a combination of religion and ancestry/culture (34%).

Aramean identity
Under the Ministry of the Interior's guidance, people born into Christian families or clans who have either Aramaic or Maronite cultural heritage within their family are eligible to register as Arameans. About 200 Christian families were thought to be eligible prior to this decision. According to an August 9, 2013 Israel Hayom article, at that time an estimated 10,500 persons were eligible to receive Aramean ethnic status according to the new regulation, including 10,000 Maronites (which included 2,000 former SLA members) and 500 Syriac Catholics.

The first person to receive the "Aramean" ethnic status in Israel was 2 year old Yaakov Halul in Jish on October 20, 2014.

Another milestone in recognizing Aramean minority as a distinct culture in Israel was made by Israeli court in 2019, which ruled that the Aramean minority could choose Jewish or Arab education, rather than making children with Aramean identity to be automatically designated to Arabic-language schools.

The recognition of the Aramean ethnicity led to mixed reactions among Israeli minorities, the Christian community, and among the general Arab Israeli population. While some celebrated the success of their long legal struggle to be recognized as a non-Arab ethnic minority, other members of the Arab community in Israel denounced it as an attempt to divide Arab Christians. Representatives of the Greek Orthodox Patriarchate of Jerusalem officially denounced the move.

Many in Israeli academia advocate the recognition of the Aramean identity and have called on the government of Israel to promote the awareness regarding this issue on the basis of the international principle of ethnic self-determination as espoused by Wilson's 14 points. One of the staunchest supporters of the recognition of the Aramean identity is Gabriel Naddaf, who is one of the leaders of the Christians in Israel. He advocated on behalf of his Aramean followers and thanked the Interior Ministry's decision as a "historic move".

Maps

See also

 Arameans in Israel
 Assyrians in Israel
 Christianity and Judaism
 Christianity in the Middle East
 Religion in Israel#Christianity
 Religion in the Middle East#Christianity

References

External links
 M. Avrum Ehrlich, Past, Present and Future Developments of Arab Christianity in the Holy Land
 Amnon Ramon, Christianity & Christians in the Jewish State: Israeli Policy toward the Churches and Christian Communities,  Jerusalem Institute for Policy Research.

 
Israeli culture
Society of Israel